Haridev Joshi University of Journalism and Mass Communication (HJU) is a state university located at Jaipur, Rajasthan, India. In similar name, but slightly different abbreviation of HJUJ, a university was established in 2012 by the Congress govt through an Act of the Government of Rajasthan which was closed in 2015 by the next BJP govt. The Congress govt returned to power in December 2018 and a new university for journalism and mass communication — HJU — was constituted through the State Legislature's Act No. 11 of 2019, at the premises of historical Khasa Kothi.

History

Establishment
HJU, the new university, was established on March1 1, 2019. This was one of new decisions taken by the Ashok Gehlot administration in the beginning of his third tenure. It was again named after journalist and former Chief Minister of Rajasthan, Haridev Joshi.

Closure of 2017 
Following the 2013 Rajasthan Legislative Assembly election and the rise of the Vasundhara Raje administration, a cabinet sub-committee has recommended the closure HJUJ as well as two other institutes, Rajiv Gandhi Tribal University (RGTU) and Dr Bhimrao Ambedkar Law University. In July 2015 the new administration renamed and moved RGTU and stopped the admission process for the following year in HJUJ redirecting students to the journalism department in Rajasthan University. This was done to "ensure that a new batch of students was not affected" by future decisions. In November 2015 Dr Bhimrao Ambedkar Law University became the first university to ever be closed in India and in January 2016 the cabinet has decided to merge HJUJ with Rajasthan University. In March 2017 a repeal bill for the closure of the university was introduced to the Rajasthan Legislative Assembly, putting an end to the possibility of reopening of the bill and HJUJ became the second university to be closed in India. The courses which were taught under HJUJ have been running under Rajasthan University's centre of mass communication since then.

Re-establishment in 2019
Following the 2018 Rajasthan Legislative Assembly election and the rise of the Third Ashok Gehlot ministry in late 2018, the cabinet has decided to open a journalism university afresh under the similar name. The Haridev Joshi University of Journalism and Mass Communication, Jaipur Bill, 2019 was introduced on 11 February 2019 and passed on 13 February. On 8 March 2019 newspaper editor Om Thanvi was appointed its first vice-chancellor (VC). The university has opened its gates in the academic year 2019–2020. In August 2022, Sudhi Rajeev was appointed VC.

Academics
The university will offer three-year undergraduate (UG) programme granting a Bachelor of Arts in Journalism and Mass Communication degree (BA-JMC), Master of Arts degrees (MA-JMC) in Print Media, Electronic Media, Social & Online Media, Development Communication and Social Work and Media Organisation, Advertising & Public Relations and six-months Diploma programmes in Functional Hindi, Functional English, Photography, DTP and Development Communication and PhD programme.

References

External links
 

Universities and colleges in Jaipur
Educational institutions established in 2012
2012 establishments in Rajasthan
Journalism schools in India
Universities in Rajasthan